Scott Gillingham is a Canadian politician who currently serves as the 44th mayor of Winnipeg, being elected on October 26, 2022. Before being elected as mayor, he was the city councillor for St. James from 2014 to 2022. He was sworn in as the mayor of Winnipeg on 1 November 2022.

Gillingham was born in Brandon, Manitoba, and raised on a farm near Carman. He played hockey in his youth, including stints with the Steinbach Hawks, Dauphin Kings and Winkler Flyers of the Manitoba Junior Hockey League.

He was a Pentecostal pastor before entering politics in 2014 as a member of the Winnipeg City Council. In 2021, he considered running in the 2021 Progressive Conservative Party of Manitoba leadership election, but decided not to, citing the party's timeline. In 2022, he was elected mayor of Winnipeg.

References

External links
 Mayor’s Office, City of Winnipeg
 Campaign website
 Hockey DB profile

Living people
Mayors of Winnipeg
21st-century Canadian politicians
Year of birth missing (living people)
Dauphin Kings players
Winkler Flyers players
Ice hockey people from Manitoba
Politicians from Brandon, Manitoba
People from Carman, Manitoba
Canadian Pentecostal pastors
Canadian sportsperson-politicians